Dufour or Du Four  or Defour  is a surname. Notable people with the surname include:

Dufour
Alma Dufour (born 1990), French politician
Amanda Ruter Dufour (1822–1899), poet
Antoine Dufour (born 1979), French-Canadian acoustic guitarist
Barry Dufour (born 1942), British academic and author
Bernard Dufour (1922–2016), French painter 
Carmen Dufour, (born 1954), a Swiss author
Catherine Dufour (born 1966), French SF and fantasy writer
Cathrine Dufour (born 1992), Danish Olympic dressage rider and influencer
Charles Dufour (born 1940), Archbishop emeritus of the Roman Catholic Archdiocese of Kingston, Jamaica
Charles L. Dufour (1903–1996), American newspaper journalist and author
Damien Dufour (born 1981), French footballer
Dany-Robert Dufour (born 1947), French philosopher
Denis Dufour (born 1953), composer
Diane Dufour, Canadian politician in the 1985 Quebec provincial election
Fabienne Dufour (born 1981), Belgian swimmer 
Francis Dufour (born 1929), Quebec politician
François Dufour (born 1953), French politician
Frédéric Dufour (born 1976), French rower
Georges Joseph Dufour (1758–1820), French General of the Revolutionary Army
Guillaume Henri Dufour (1787–1875), Swiss general, bridge engineer and topographer
Guy Dufour (born 1987), Belgian football (soccer) player
Hortense Dufour (born 1946), French writer
Jean Dufour (1818–1883) (1818–1883), French politician
Jean Dufour (born 1949), French politician
Jean-Marie Dufour (born 1949), Canadian econometrician and statistician at McGill University
Joseph Dufour (1744–1829), political figure from Lower Canada
Kirsten Dufour (born 1943), Danish visual artist
Léon Jean Marie Dufour (1780–1865), French medical doctor and naturalist
Lisette Dufour (born 1949), Québécoise voice actress
Louis Dufour (1901–1960), Swiss ice hocker player
Luc Dufour (born 1963), ice hockey player
Lynsey DuFour, American soap opera writer 
Marc Dufour (1941–2015), Canadian ice hockey player
Marc Dufour (ophthalmologist) (1843–1910), Swiss ophthalmologist
Marie-France Dufour (1949–1990)
Marjolain Dufour (born 1958), Québécois politician
Nicolas Dufour (born 1987), Canadian politician
, drummer with The Libertines
Philippe Sylvestre Dufour (1622–1687), French Protestant apothecary, banker, and author
Pierre Dufour (canoeist) (fl, 1950s), Swiss slalom canoeist
Pierre Dufour (politician),  Canadian politician and businessman
Pierre Dufour, pseudonym of Paul Lacroix used when publishing 
Pierre Dufour d'Astafort, French equestrian and Olympic medalist
Pierre-Eugène Dufour (1855–1922), pseudonym of Paterne Berrichon, French poet, painter, sculptor and designer
Richard DuFour (1947–2017), American educational researcher
Sergio Gama Dufour (born 1966), Mexican politician
Simon Dufour (born 1979), French swimmer who swam at the 2008 Olympics
Sylvain Dufour (born 1982), French alpine snowboarder
Thomas Dufour (born 1973), French curler
Val Dufour (1927–2000), American actor
Vincent Dufour (born 1969), former French football player
Wafah Dufour (born 1975), American model
Carmine Pierre-Dufour, Canadian film director and screenwriter

Du Four
Vital du Four (1260–1327), French Franciscan theologian and scholastic philosopher; and cardinal
François du Four (1871–1945), Belgian industrialist
Louis Du Four de Longuerue (1652–1733), antiquarian, linguist and historian, known as abbé de Longuerue

Defour
Steven Defour (born 1988), Belgian soccer player
Mark Defour, U.S.V.I. national cycling champ, see 2013 national road cycling championships

Characters 
Corinne Dufour, helicopter pilot in Moonraker

See also
Dufour (disambiguation)
Dufour-Lapointe, a surname